Predrag Šuput (born June 1, 1977) is a former Serbian professional basketball player. He is a 2.00 m (6 ft 7 in) tall small forward.

Professional career
On 8 August 2012, he signed with KK Cedevita which played in the EuroLeague for the first time in club history.

EuroLeague career statistics

|-
| style="text-align:left;"| 2005–06
| style="text-align:left;"| Partizan
| 14 || 8 || 25.2 || .426 || .389 || .773 || 3.9 || 1.4 || 1.6 || .1 || 8.4 || 7.3
|-
| style="text-align:left;"| 2007–08
| style="text-align:left;"| Brose Baskets
| 13 || 13 || 27.8 || .469 || .378 || .611 || 4.3 || 1.6 || .8 || .1 || 9.8 || 9.7
|-
| style="text-align:left;"| 2010–11
| style="text-align:left;"| Brose Baskets
| 9 || 9 || 21.4 || .487 || .304 || .750 || 2.1 || 1.7 || .9 || .1 || 10.0 || 6.9
|-
| style="text-align:left;"| 2011–12
| style="text-align:left;"| Brose Baskets
| 10 || 3 || 22.6 || .446 || .300 || .900 || 4.2 || 1.5 || .8 || .2 || 10.9 || 10.3
|-
| style="text-align:left;"| 2012–13
| style="text-align:left;"| Cedevita
| 10 || 8 || 22.6 || .455 || .316 || .714 || 2.6 || 1.7 || .2 || .1 || 7.6 || 5.7
|- class="sortbottom"
| style="text-align:left;"| Career
| style="text-align:left;"|
| 56 || 41 || 24.6 || .455 || .345 || .731 || 3.5 || 1.6 || 1.1 || .1 || 9.3 || 8.0

References

External links
 Predrag Šuput at aba-liga.com
 Predrag Šuput at euroleague.net
 

1977 births
Living people
ABA League players
Brose Bamberg players
KK Cedevita players
KK Hemofarm players
KK Partizan players
KK Vojvodina Srbijagas players
KK Spartak Subotica players
Sportspeople from Gospić
Serbian expatriate basketball people in Croatia
Serbian expatriate basketball people in Germany
Serbian men's basketball players
Serbs of Croatia
Yugoslav Wars refugees
Refugees in Serbia
Small forwards